Wisdom Kanu (born 27 March 1994) is a Nigerian professional footballer who plays as a midfielder for Fortuna Liga club Zemplín Michalovce.

Club career

MFK Zemplín Michalovce
Wisdom Kanu made his professional Fortuna Liga debut for Zemplín Michalovce against DAC 1904 Dunajská Streda on 25 July 2021.

References

External links
 
 
 Futbalnet profile 

1994 births
Living people
Residents of Lagos
Nigerian footballers
Nigerian expatriate footballers
Association football midfielders
FK Spišská Nová Ves players
FK Inter Bratislava players
FC ViOn Zlaté Moravce players
MFK Vranov nad Topľou players
FK Poprad players
FK Slavoj Trebišov players
MFK Zemplín Michalovce players
Slovak Super Liga players
2. Liga (Slovakia) players
3. Liga (Slovakia) players
Expatriate footballers in Slovakia
Nigerian expatriate sportspeople in Slovakia